Christopher Gore was a prominent Massachusetts lawyer, Federalist politician, and U.S. diplomat.

Christopher Gore may also refer to:
 Christopher Gore (writer), an American screenwriter, playwright, and lyricist
 Christopher Israel Umba Gore, an Ugandan military officer